California is an unincorporated village in the town of Stockholm, Aroostook County, Maine, United States.

References

Villages in Aroostook County, Maine
Villages in Maine